Yes Stars HD (styled as yes stars HD) is an Israeli high definition television channel carried by the Israeli satellite television provider yes, which broadcasts American television shows. The channel aired on March 25, 2008 and part of it simulcasted with yes stars 1 and yes stars 2 on selected shows. The rest of the broadcasts are of shows previously broadcast only in standard definition, but now also in HD.

The channel aired as part of yes re-branding the television shows' channels on March 14, 2008 and now the yes stars group of channels is formed from yes stars 1, yes stars 2, yes stars 3, yes stars Israeli and yes stars HD.

On December 14, 2008, as part of a new re-brand of yes television shows channels, yes stars HD obtained a new logo and now simulcast shows from yes stars Action, yes stars Drama and yes stars Comedy. The channel aired on channel 501 until April 6, 2009, then the channel moved to channel 994 and on the end of the broadcast day of April 21, 2009 it was cancelled.

As of April 22, 2009, there are two HD shows channels: yes stars Drama HD on channel 993 and yes stars Action HD on channel 994.

Broadcasting format
yes stars HD was available only to the HD consumers of yes, using yes' HD set-top box.
The broadcasting system is DVB-S2.
Shows were broadcast in an original aspect ratio of 16:9 (widescreen).
The shows were broadcast in a resolution of 1080i50.
The shows were being compressed using H.264 compression format.
Supported contents should also be broadcast in 5.1 channels of Dolby Digital surround sound, but instead it broadcast in 2.0 channels of Dolby Digital.
There was also support for contents in a resolution of 720p.

Shows broadcast on yes stars HD

External links

Television channels in Israel
Yes (Israel)